Bimpson is an English surname. Notable people with the surname include:

 Louis Bimpson (born 1929), English footballer
 Francesca Bimpson (died 2008), English murder victim

See also
 Bimson
 Simpson (name)

English-language surnames